Teropha is a genus of beetles in the family Carabidae, containing the following species:

 Teropha besti (Sloane, 1902)
 Teropha sturtii (White, 1859)

References

Pterostichinae
Taxa named by François-Louis Laporte, comte de Castelnau